Zhanaozen (pronounced [ʑɑŋɑøˈzʲen]), formerly known as Novy Uzen, is a city in the Mangystau Region of Kazakhstan located south-east of the city of Aktau. The name of the town means "new river" in Kazakh. Janaozen is a city of regional significance. It is completely surrounded by the territory of Karakiya District, but administratively does not belong to the district. It had a population of 147,962 in 2018; the census population in 2009 was 113,014, and that in 1999 had been 63,337.

History
The town of Zhanaozen was founded in 1964, after the opening of an oil field in Uzen. On 21 October 1968 Novy Uzen took the status of a settlement of town type, and since 20 March 1973 the status of a city of regional significance. June 1989 saw large disorders. Novy Uzen was renamed Zhanaozen in October 1993.

2011 oil strike

In May 2011, workers from the Ozenmunaigas oil field went on strike over pay. The strike was declared illegal by local courts and the state oil company sacked nearly 1000 employees. Some of the sacked workers then occupied the town square in protest. On 16 December 2011 police were accused of firing on them. Fifteen people (workers and police officers) were killed according to government officials, though opposition sources put the death toll in the dozens. In disturbances that day local government offices, a hotel and an office of the state oil company were set on fire, according to General Prosecutor Askhat Daulbayev. Eighty-six people were injured in the clashes – according to the authorities – and due to shortage of hospital beds in Zhanaozen, many were taken to be treated in the regional capital Aktau, about 150 km away.

2022 protests 
The 2022 Kazakh protests began in Zhanaozen after a sharp increase in gas prices (the Kazakh government claiming this was due to high demand and price fixes), corruption, authoritarianism, human rights violations, and police brutality. The protest soon spread to other regions of Kazakhstan, and as of Jan 8, 2022, the government has resigned and the new government has promised to change the gas prices to 50 Kazakhstani tenge for the next 6 months.

Location and geography
Zhanaozen is located in the desert on Mangyshlak Peninsula.

Climate
Zhanaozen has a cold desert climate (Köppen climate classification BWk) with sharp continental influences. Strong winds are present on a big extent of year.
Winters not long, but rather frosty. Average winter temperature -5 -7 degrees Celsius, can sometimes reach -15 -17 degrees Celsius. Snow cover low power. Strong winds cause long snowstorms. 
Summer always hot, droughty and long. Average summer temperature +34 +36 degrees Celsius, can sometimes reach +45 degrees Celsius. The extremely rare rains have storm character. Average annual amount of precipitation of 120 mm. Rainfall is evenly distributed for all year slightly the increase in rainfall is observed during the spring period.

Population 
Population of the town with the adjacent villages of Kyzylsay (3,500 people), Tenge (18,700 people) and Rakhat (30,800 people) for the end of the 2012 reporting period made 129,600 people or 22.2% of the total population of the Mangystau region. In comparison, of 2012 the population increased on 4,500 people due to birth rate growth. National structure - Kazakhs, Russians, Karakalpaks and other nations.

Sport

Sports clubs 
Futsal club of Munaishy acting in the championship of Kazakhstan on a futsal.

Sports constructions 

Stadium of Amin Tuyakov.
Physical culture-improvements complex (PIC) of Rakhmet Utesinov.
"Energetik" children-young mans sport school (CYSS).

Transport 
Zhanaozen is a terminal station at the railway connecting it to Gorgan (Zhanaozen — Gyzylgaya — Bereket — Gyzyletrek — Gorgan).

The city transport is presented by generally passenger "GAZelles" (12 routes, approx. 120 units) and private taxi. The cost of a passenger journey — 40 tenge (half price for children), and a taxi — 150-300 tenge.

Famous residents 
 Altynay Sapargalieva

See also 

 Railway stations in Kazakhstan

References 

Cities and towns in Kazakhstan
Populated places in Mangystau Region
Populated places established in 1968